Sunrise on Mercury is a collection by Robert Silverberg published in 1983.

Plot summary
Sunrise on Mercury is a collection that comprises thirteen stories dated 1954 to 1979.

Reception
Dave Langford reviewed Sunrise on Mercury for White Dwarf #76, and stated that "All are exceedingly slick and competent, though I wonder whether Silverberg in 1986 feels twinges of guilt about his patronizing attitude to 'primitive' aliens back in the 50s. The whole book goes down smoothly and tastes pretty good throughout. Half an hour later you'll be hungry again."

Reviews
Review by Ken Lake (1986) in Paperback Inferno, #59

References

1983 short story collections
Science fiction short story collections
Short story collections by Robert Silverberg
Victor Gollancz Ltd books